Maria de Rudenz is a dramma tragico, or tragic opera, in three parts by Gaetano Donizetti. The Italian libretto was written by Salvadore Cammarano, based on "a piece of Gothic horror", La nonne sanglante by  Auguste Anicet-Bourgeois and Julien de Mallian, and The Monk by Matthew Gregory Lewis. It premiered at La Fenice in Venice, on 30 January 1838.

Performance history
19th century

While the initial performances were not very successful (Donizetti regarded them as "a fiasco"), the opera was withdrawn after two performances. It was given 14 performances in Rome in 1841 but, again, it was received with little enthusiasm. Finally, an "excellent production and superior singing this time won vigorous approval" in a production in Rome in 1841, and this was followed by one in Naples in 1848 at the Teatro Nuovo and three years later for a production at the Teatro San Carlo.

20th century and beyond

The opera did not receive a production in the UK until the Opera Rara concert presentation in London on 27 October 1974. The first staged presentations in the 20th century took place at La Fenice beginning on 21 December 1980 with Katia Ricciarelli in the title role. Both have been recorded. Among other performances, the opera was staged at the Donizetti Festival, Bergamo, in 2013 and by the Wexford Opera Festival in 2016.

Roles

Synopsis
Place: Switzerland
Time: 1400

Maria de Rudenz falls in love with Corrado against her father's wishes and flees with him to Venice. In Venice, Corrado suspects that Maria is unfaithful to him, abandons her, returns to Rudenz Castle, and falls in love with Maria's cousin Mathilde.

Maria returns to her ancestor's castle and discovers that her lover is not only going to marry her cousin, but that in fact he is also the son of a murderer. She is ready to keep his secret if only Corrado returns to her. Corrado refuses and in a rage injures her with his sword so that everyone thinks that she is dead.

On the wedding day of Mathilde and Corrado, Maria appears again. Maria reveals Corrado's secret to everyone, murders Mathilde, and commits suicide.

Recordings

References
Notes

Sources
Allitt, John Stewart (1991), Donizetti: in the light of Romanticism and the teaching of Johann Simon Mayr, Shaftesbury: Element Books, Ltd (UK); Rockport, MA: Element, Inc.(USA)
Ashbrook, William (1982), Donizetti and His Operas, Cambridge University Press.  
Ashbrook, William  (1998), "Donizetti, Gaetano" in Stanley Sadie (Ed.),  The New Grove Dictionary of Opera, Vol. Three, pp. 201–203. London: MacMillan Publishers, Inc.   
Ashbrook, William and Sarah Hibberd (2001), in  Holden, Amanda (Ed.), The New Penguin Opera Guide, New York: Penguin Putnam. .  pp. 224 – 247.
Black, John (1982), Donizetti’s Operas in Naples, 1822—1848. London: The Donizetti Society.
Loewenberg, Alfred (1970). Annals of Opera, 1597-1940, 2nd edition. Rowman and Littlefield
Osborne, Charles, (1994),  The Bel Canto Operas of Rossini, Donizetti, and Bellini,  Portland, Oregon: Amadeus Press. 
Sadie, Stanley, (Ed.); John Tyrell (Exec. Ed.) (2004), The New Grove Dictionary of Music and Musicians.  2nd edition. London: Macmillan.    (hardcover).   (eBook).
 Weinstock, Herbert (1963), Donizetti and the World of Opera in Italy, Paris, and Vienna in the First Half of the Nineteenth Century, New York: Pantheon Books.

External links
 Donizetti Society (London) website
Italian libretto

Italian-language operas
Operas by Gaetano Donizetti
1838 operas
Operas
Opera world premieres at La Fenice
Operas based on novels
Operas set in Switzerland